Sethia is a census town in Chhindwara district in the Indian state of Madhya Pradesh.

Demographics
 India census, Sethia had a population of 4,559. Males constitute 54% of the population and females 46%. Sethia has an average literacy rate of 61%, higher than the national average of 59.5%: male literacy is 70%, and female literacy is 50%. In Sethia, 14% of the population is under 6 years of age.

Transport
The nearest airport is Jabalpur.

References

Cities and towns in Chhindwara district